This article presents the filmography of English actor Oliver Reed.

Film

1950s

1960s

1970s

1980s

1990s

2000s

Television

Awards and nominations

References

External links
 
 

Male actor filmographies
British filmographies